Heshmatabad (also Romanized as Heshmatābād) is a village in Halil Rural District, in the Central District of Jiroft County, Kerman Province, Iran. At the 2006 census, its population was 26, in 5 families.

References 

Populated places in Jiroft County